Juhn Atsushi Wada, OC (born March 28, 1924) is a Japanese Canadian neurologist known for research into epilepsy and human brain asymmetry, including his description of the Wada test for cerebral hemispheric dominance of language function. The Wada Test remains the gold standard for establishing cerebral dominance and is conducted worldwide prior to epilepsy surgery.

He is Professor Emeritus in the Department of Psychiatry and Neurosciences at the UBC Faculty of Medicine. He has edited 11 books and published over 300 papers on human brain asymmetry, the neurobiology of epilepsy, and kindling.

Biography 
Juhn Wada studied medicine at Hokkaido University, qualifying as a Doctor of Medicine in 1946 and qualifying as a Doctor of Medical Science in 1951. He was an assistant professor of neurology and psychiatry at Hokkaido University after which he worked at the University of Minnesota and the Montreal Neurological Institute before settling at the University of British Columbia in 1956, becoming Professor of Neurology.

Wada established the first Seizure Investigation Unit in 1979 and the Epilepsy Surgical Program at UBC Hospital which serves patients across Western Canada. He was an attending neurologist at Vancouver General Hospital and UBC Hospital. He served as Director of the EEG Department at UBC Hospital from 1969 to 1994 and Director of the Seizure Investigation Unit from 1980 to 1994. He was career investigator and associate of the Medical Research Council of Canada from 1963 to 1994.

Presidencies 

 1975-2001: Founding President, Vancouver Society for Epilepsy Research
 1977–79: Founding President, Canadian League Against Epilepsy (CLAE)
 1977–79: President, Western Institute of Epilepsy (USA)
 1985–86: President, American Clinical Neurophysiology Society (née American EEG Society)
 1988–89: President, American Epilepsy Society

Awards and honours 

 1976: Distinguished Service Award from the Epilepsy Foundation of America
1976: Lennox Award, Western Institute of Epilepsy
 1978: Gold Medallion from the International League against Epilepsy
1978: Juhn and Mary Wada Prize established by the Japan Epilepsy Society
 1981: Ambassador for Epilepsy Award by the International League Against Epilepsy and the International Bureau for Epilepsy
 1992: Officer of the Order of Canada
 1985: Order of Sacred Treasure of Japan, Gold and Silver Star
 1998: Wilder Penfield Gold Medal Award by the Canadian League Against Epilepsy
 1998: William G. Lennox Award  of the American Epilepsy Society
 2001: Herbert H. Jasper Award of the American Clinical Neurophysiology Society
 2002: Queen Elizabeth II Golden Jubilee Medal
 2003: Doctor of Science Honoris Causa from the University of British Columbia
 2012: Queen Elizabeth II Diamond Jubilee Medal
 2013: Lifetime Achievement Award of the International League Against Epilepsy and the International Bureau for Epilepsy
 2019: Vancouver Coastal Health Medical Staff Hall of Honour

References 

Canadian neurologists
Officers of the Order of Canada
1924 births
Living people
Japanese expatriates in the United States
Japanese emigrants to Canada